Heckfield Heath is a hamlet in the civil parish of Heckfield in the Hart district of Hampshire, England. Its nearest town is Hook, which lies approximately 4.6 miles (7.4 km) south from the hamlet.

Villages in Hampshire